Baking Board is a rural locality in the Western Downs Region, Queensland, Australia. In the  Baking Board had a population of 97 people.

History 
The locality's name comes from Bakingboard Creek, reportedly so named because a piece of bark was found there and used as a damper mixing board.

Baking Board State School opened on 15 May 1909. It closed for a short period in 1930 due to low student numbers. It closed permanently on 1 August 1961. It was located near the Warrego Highway (approx ).

In 1914 a Methodist church was opened in Baking Board.

In the  Baking Board had a population of 97 people.

References

Further reading 
 

Localities in Queensland
Western Downs Region